Rapala domitia is a butterfly in the family Lycaenidae. It was described by William Chapman Hewitson in 1863. It is found in the Indomalayan realm.

Subspecies
Rapala domitia domitia (Peninsular Malaysia, Singapore)
Rapala domitia flemingi Eliot, 1969 (Langkawi, possibly southern Thailand)
Rapala domitia albapex de Nicéville, 1897 (Borneo)

References

External links
Rapala at Markku Savela's Lepidoptera and Some Other Life Forms

Rapala (butterfly)
Butterflies described in 1863
Taxa named by William Chapman Hewitson
Butterflies of Asia